Anthony Frost (born 1951) is a British painter noted for his abstract works consisting of brightly coloured prints and collages.

Biography
Frost was born in St. Ives, Cornwall, the son of Sir Terry Frost. From 1970 to 1973 he studied at the Cardiff College of Art gaining a BA (Hons) in Fine Art. His work featured in the "Art Now Cornwall" exhibition at Tate St Ives in 2007.

He has been Artist-in-residence at the Cyprus College of Art, Paphos and the Montmiral School of Painting, France.

Frost is a fan of The Fall and his work appears on a number of their record covers, most notably Extricate.

The painter's works are included in the public art collections of the Kasser Mochary Foundation, New York and King's College, Cambridge.

Personal life
Frost works at a studio in Penzance and lives in the hamlet of Rosemergy. He is the brother of actor and comedian Stephen Frost.

See also 

 List of St. Ives artists
 Luke Frost

References

External links
Gallery of paintings

1951 births
Living people
20th-century English painters
English male painters
21st-century English painters
21st-century English male artists
St Ives artists
Academics of the University for the Creative Arts
Academics of Anglia Ruskin University
People from St Ives, Cornwall
Alumni of Cardiff School of Art and Design
20th-century English male artists